Elm Court is a heritage-listed former carriage house and harness workshop and now motel at 435 Townsend Street, Albury, City of Albury, New South Wales, Australia. It was designed by Gordon and Gordon and built in 1885. The property is owned by Indexe Pty Ltd. It was added to the New South Wales State Heritage Register on 2 April 1999.

History 
Elm Court was constructed as a coach building and harness workshop for James Higgins, with a residence on the upper floor. Higgins opened for business in 1888.

It was converted into a motel in the mid-1980s.

Description 
Red brick, two-storey construction in the Georgian style. The ground floor has a large, wide door in the northern end of the eastern façade, reflecting its original purpose as a coach building business.

Heritage listing 
Elm Court was constructed in c.1880 as a coach building and harness making establishment with a residence on the second floor. The business, during its operation, added substantially to the economy of Albury. Currently it is a contributory item to the historic character of Albury.

Early coach industry in Albury - important for its silhouette and several recyclings.

Elm Court was listed on the New South Wales State Heritage Register on 2 April 1999.

See also

References

Bibliography

Attribution

External links

New South Wales State Heritage Register
Albury, New South Wales
Commercial buildings in New South Wales
Buildings and structures in New South Wales
Motels
Industrial buildings in New South Wales
Carriage houses
Articles incorporating text from the New South Wales State Heritage Register